Bürgel is a town in the Saale-Holzland district, in Thuringia, Germany. It is situated 12 km east of Jena. It contains the Benedictine monastery of Bürgel Abbey.

History
Within the German Empire (1871-1918), Bürgel was part of the Grand Duchy of Saxe-Weimar-Eisenach.

Sons and daughters of the city 
 Zacharias Brendel der Ältere (1553-1626), philosopher, physicist, physician and botanist at the University of Jena

References

Towns in Thuringia
Saale-Holzland-Kreis
Grand Duchy of Saxe-Weimar-Eisenach